The Aichi C4A, company designation Aichi AM-20, experimental designation Aichi 13-Shi High-speed Reconnaissance Aircraft, was a late 1930s project by Aichi for a carrier-borne reconnaissance aircraft.

Design and development
In the late 1930s, the Imperial Japanese Navy Air Service (IJNAS), having felt impressed at the performance of the Mitsubishi Ki-15 for the Imperial Japanese Army Air Service (IJAAS), issued a requirement for a fast reconnaissance aircraft under the IJNAS designation 13-Shi High-speed Reconnaissance Aircraft. Aichi, drawing upon experience designing the Aichi D3A, proposed a single-engine, low wing monoplane powered by a radial engine and fitted with a closed cockpit with two seats in tandem, as well 
as a rear-mounted  machine gun. The design was known by the experimental designation and allocated the short designation C4A by the IJNAS.

A full-scale mockup was completed in March 1939 for inspection by IJN officials. However, the IJN decided to shelve the C4A in favor of their own version of the Ki-15, the C5M.

References 

1930s Japanese military reconnaissance aircraft
C4A
Single-engined tractor aircraft